Vernonia is a genus of about 350 species of forbs and shrubs in the Daisy family Asteraceae. Some species are known as ironweed. Some species are edible and of economic value. They are known for having intense purple flowers. There have been numerous distinct subgenera and subsections named in this genus, and some botanists have divided the genus into several distinct genera. For instance, the Flora of North America recognizes only about twenty species in Vernonia sensu stricto, seventeen of which are in North America north of Mexico, with the others being found in South America.

Taxonomy
The genus was circumscribed by Johann Christian Daniel von Schreber in Gen. Pl. ed. 8[a]. vol.2 on page 541 in 1791.

The genus name of Vernonia is in honour of William Vernon (1666/67 - ca.1711), who was an English plant collector, (bryologist) and entomologist from Cambridge University, who collected in Maryland, USA in 1698.

Species

Species of this genus are found in South America, Africa, Southeast Asia, and North America. Vernonia species are well known for hybridizing between similar species in areas of overlapping ranges. There are approximately 350 species in the genus. A selected list is given below.

North America
Vernonia acaulis
Vernonia arkansana
Vernonia angustifolia
Vernonia baldwinii
Vernonia blodgettii
Vernonia fasciculata
Vernonia flaccidifolia
Vernonia gigantea or Vernonia altissima
Vernonia glauca
Vernonia larseniae
Vernonia lettermannii
Vernonia lindheimeri
Vernonia marginata
Vernonia missurica
Vernonia noveboracensis
Vernonia proctorii
Vernonia pulchella
Vernonia texana

South America
Vernonia nonoensis
Vernonia patens
Vernonia scorpioides
Vernonia condensata

Africa
Vernonia amygdalina
Vernonia calvoana
Vernonia colorata
Vernonia galamensis
Vernonia kotschyana
Vernonia staehelinoides
Vernonia cineria
vernonia myriantha

Asia
Vernonia arborea
Vernonia cockburniana
Vernonia elaeagnifolia
Vernonia unicata
Vernonia zollingerianoides

Uses
Several species of Vernonia, including V. calvoana, V. amygdalina, and V. colorata, are eaten as leaf vegetables. Common names for these species include bitterleaf, onugbu in the Igbo language, ewuro and ndole. They are common in most West African and Central African countries. They are one of the most widely consumed leaf vegetables of Nigeria, where the onugbu soup is a local delicacy of the Igbo people, and of Cameroon, where they are a key ingredient of Ndolé: the national dish of Cameroon. The leaves have a sweet and bitter taste. They are sold fresh or dried and are a typical ingredient in egusi soup.

Vernonia galamensis is used as an oilseed in East Africa. It is grown in many parts of Ethiopia, especially around the city of Harar, with an average seed yield of 2 to 2.5 t/ha. It is reported that the Ethiopian strains of Vernonia have the highest oil content, up to 41.9% with up to 80% vernolic acid, and is used in paint formulations, coatings plasticizers, and as a reagent for many industrial chemicals.

Vernonia amygdalina is used in traditional herbal medicine. These leaves are exported from several African countries and can be purchased in grocery stores aiming to serve African clients. In Brazil, V. condensata is commonly known as "figatil" or "necroton" and used in local traditional medicine.

Ecology

Vernonia species are used as food plants by the larvae of some Lepidoptera species including Coleophora vernoniaeella (which feeds exclusively on the genus) and Schinia regia (which feeds exclusively on V. texana). Vernonia is a very diverse genus, varying from the tiny V. desertorum of Brazil which is only  three inches (8 centimeters) tall to Vernonia arborea of the East Indies which, at 117 feet (36 meters) is the tallest of all composites; a 472 fold difference in height. The leaves can vary from quite small up to  four feet (1.2 meters) long by up to  15 inches (38 centimeters) in width in the case of V. conferta of Cameroon.

References

Asteraceae genera